Nephrochirus is a genus of spiders in the family Oonopidae. It was first described in 1910 by Simon. , it contains only one species, Nephrochirus copulatus, collected in Namibia.

References

Oonopidae
Monotypic Araneomorphae genera
Taxa named by Eugène Simon